McArthur is a surname. It comes from the Celtic personal name Arthur. It denotes the 'son of Arthur', which means noble one.

Notable people with the surname include:

 Alexander McArthur (disambiguation)
 Barry McArthur (born 1947), English footballer
 Bruce McArthur (born 1951), Canadian serial killer
 Charles McArthur (1844–1910), British maritime insurance specialist and Liberal Unionist politician from Liverpool, MP between 1897 and 1910
 Daniel McArthur (1867–1943), Scottish footballer
 Duncan McArthur (1772–1839), 11th Governor of Ohio
 Gale McArthur (1929–2020), All-American basketball player
 James McArthur (born 1987), Scottish footballer
 John McArthur (1826–1906), Union general during the American Civil War
 Katherine McArthur (born 1971), American astronaut
 Kathleen McArthur (1915–2000), Australian environmental activist
 Ken McArthur (1881–1960), South African athlete
 Lewis A. McArthur (1883–1951), American businessman, geographer and author
 Lewis Linn McArthur (1843–1897), American newspaper publisher and Oregon Supreme Court Justice
 Nancy McArthur (born 1931), American children's author
 Reginald McArthur (1954–2018), American singer, member of the R&B group the Controllers
 Stewart McArthur (born 1937), Australian politician
 Wally McArthur (disambiguation)
 William Pope McArthur (1814–1850), a United States Coast Survey officer
 William S. McArthur (born 1951), American astronaut
 Raymond J. McArthur (born 1990), Professional Face Painter

See also
 Clan Arthur
 MacArthur (surname)